Mark Francesco Zanotti (born 11 August 1964) is a former Australian rules footballer who played with the West Coast Eagles, Brisbane Bears and Fitzroy Football Club in the Australian Football League (AFL). 

Zanotti usually played at fullback and started his career with Scarborough before joining Subiaco in the West Australian Football League (WAFL). He played in their 1986 premiership and won the Simpson Medal for best on ground in the grand final. The following season he joined then VFL and was a member of West Coast's inaugural side. After two seasons he moved to Brisbane and had his best season in 1990 when he finished third in their best and fairest. He finished his career at Fitzroy from 1993 until 1995, adding 57 games. In addition to playing for three VFL/AFL clubs he also represented Western Australia five times in interstate football.

After finishing his career in Australia he moved to the UK where he was one of the founders of the London Gryphons who subsequently became the Putney Magpies.

External links

Mark Zanotti's playing statistics from WAFL Footy Facts

1964 births
Living people
Australian rules footballers from Western Australia
Fitzroy Football Club players
Brisbane Bears players
West Coast Eagles players
Western Australian State of Origin players
Subiaco Football Club players
Place of birth missing (living people)